The 7th AEAUSA to be held in New Jersey. The award show to be hosted by Nancy Isime, Idris Sultan, and
Jynnyn Edwards. The nominees were announced on 1 November 2021, following the opening of the voting portal (vote.aeausa.net), with Wizkid leading with eight nominations. Tems, and Diamond Platnumz with six nominations. Tiwa Savage, Burna Boy, and Focalistic with five nominations. Wizkid had the highest award winnings at the 7th AEAUSA Awards by securing 5 awards at the ceremony.

This year's award included a new category named the Best African Movie, to support the creation of quality Nigerian movies, with a non-voting category awarded to Julius Maada Bio, Teni, Oluwole Ogundare, Peggy Kenol, Nyla Tamin, and Empak Corp. The 7th African Entertainment Awards USA, was produced by Dominic Tamin, Nyla Tamin, Oluwole Ogundare, and Peggy Kenol.

Performers
List of its event hosts, award presenters, and music performances.

Host(s)
 Nancy Isime
 Idris Sultan
 Jynnyn Edwards

Presenters
 Dr Nelson Aluya MD
 Nyla Tamin
 Oluwole Ogundare
 Abdirahman Mohamed 
 DJ Subeer 
 II-Kaya Ises
 Anita Kakule
 Patricia Nabakooza
 Fatima Sesay 
 Fahyvanny
 Miri Ben-Ari
 Mr. Leo
 Adejayan Adeola Ruth
 Martha Heredia
 Douglas Lwang

Performances
 Spice Diana
 Triplets ghetto kids
 Sami Bey 
 Teni 
 Manamba Kanté
 Soul Bang’s 
 Mical Teja 
 Rheone Bourne 
 Afro Afrique 
 Martha Heredia

Nominees and Winners
The following is a list of nominees and the winners are listed highlighted in boldface.

Special Recognition Awards

References

External links
 AEAUSA YouTube Channel
 AEAUSA 

2021 music awards
2021 awards
2021 awards in the United States